The following lists events that happened during 1933 in Chile.

Incumbents
President of Chile: Arturo Alessandri

Events

April
19 April – The Socialist Party of Chile is founded.

Births 
27 July – Marlene Ahrens (d. 2020)
26 October – Raúl Sánchez (d. 2016)
28 October – Armando Uribe (d. 2020)

Deaths
3 May – Francisco Contreras Valenzuela (b. 1877)

References 

 
Years of the 20th century in Chile
Chile